Slatyfork Wildlife Management Area is located on  north of Marlinton in Pocahontas and Randolph Counties, West Virginia.  It protects a narrow strip of river bottom along the forks of Elk River headwaters.

See also
Animal conservation
Fishing
Hunting
List of West Virginia wildlife management areas

References

External links
West Virginia DNR District 3 Wildlife Management Areas

Wildlife management areas of West Virginia
Protected areas of Pocahontas County, West Virginia
Protected areas of Randolph County, West Virginia